Brachytremelloides is a genus of mites in the family Diarthrophallidae.

Species
 Brachytremelloides brevipoda Schuster & Summers, 1978      
 Brachytremelloides mastigophora Schuster & Summers, 1978      
 Brachytremelloides minuta Schuster & Summers, 1978      
 Brachytremelloides striata Womersley, 1961

References

Mesostigmata
Acari genera
Articles created by Qbugbot